Shehzada is a 1972 Bollywood drama film produced by Surinder Kapoor and directed by K. Shankar, set during the British Raj. The film stars Rajesh Khanna and Raakhee as the lead pair and the supporting cast included Veena, Pandari Bai and Karan Dawan. The music was composed by R. D. Burman. This was remake of Tamil film Idhu Sathiyam (1963). The producer Surinder Kapoor quoted in an interview "Rajesh Khanna who played the title-role in Shehzada was truly of a princely disposition. He started shooting for me without ever discussing the price, saying that we could settle that once the film is made, he said and made banner S. K. International Films became an acknowledged company."

Cast
Rajesh Khanna as Rajesh
Raakhee as Chanda
Madan Puri as Chanda's Maternal Uncle
Veena as Rajlaxmi
Karan Dewan as Ratan
Pandari Bai as Janki
Sunder as Nekiram
Mohan Choti as Nandu

Plot
Circa British rule in India, wealthy DIG of Police is approached by Devdutt, a poor freedom fighter, who would like his daughter, Janki, to marry the DIG's son, Ratan. The DIG and his wife Rajlaxmi refuse to have to do anything with Devdutt, but Ratan refuses to marry anyone else. They eventually relent and agree to this marriage. Shortly after the marriage, riots ensue between the police and freedom fighters, and as a result the DIG is killed. Rajlaxmi blames Devdutt for his death, and asks a pregnant Janki to leave her house. Unable to stand up for his wife, Ratan remains a silent spectator while his wife is thrown out. Janki goes to live with her father, who eventually passes away, and it is then Janki gives birth to a son, Rajesh. Years later, Rajesh has grown up, drives a truck, and is in love with a local shop-keeper, Chanda, who he would like to marry. Janki would like her son to go and meet his dad, and when Rajesh does so, Rajlaxmi arranges a pompous welcome for him with open arms, hoping that he will leave his mother and stay on with her. But Rajesh refuses to do this unless Rajlaxmi apologizes to Janki. An enraged Rajlaxmi refuses to do so, and asks Rajesh to leave. Rajesh and Chanda get married, and soon Chanda gets pregnant. Then the police arrest Rajesh, for which he may face several years in prison. He is held in the local police station. The truth does prevail, the real culprit is caught, and Rajesh is let go. He returns home to find out that everything is not the same anymore. Chanda has given birth a baby boy, and now lives with Rajlaxmi, and refuses to return home. Rajesh must now find out what compelled Chanda to leave Janki and go to live with Rajlaxmi.

Reception
Shehzada was one of the successful film of Rajesh Khanna when he was on peak and gained popularity among his fans

Soundtrack

References

External links
 

1972 films
Indian family films
Indian drama films
Hindi remakes of Tamil films
1970s Hindi-language films
1972 drama films
Films scored by R. D. Burman
Films directed by K. Shankar
Hindi-language drama films